The following lists events that happened during 2000 in Ghana.

Incumbents
 President: Jerry John Rawlings
 Vice President: John Atta Mills
 Chief Justice: Isaac Kobina Abban

Events

January

February

March
6 March - 43rd independence anniversary.

April

May

June

July
1 July - Republic day celebrations held across the country.

August

September

October

November

December
Annual farmers' day celebrations held.
7 December - Presidential elections held in Ghana.

National holidays
Holidays in italics are "special days", while those in regular type are "regular holidays".
 January 1: New Year's Day
 March 6: Independence Day
 May 1: Labor Day
 December 25: Christmas
 December 26: Boxing day

In addition, several other places observe local holidays, such as the foundation of their town. These are also "special days."

References

 
Years of the 20th century in Ghana
2000s in Ghana
Ghana
Ghana